Chiesa di Sant'Andrea is  a church on the Piazza della Repubblica in Orvieto, Umbria, central Italy. It dates to the 12th century and is noted for its distinctive decagonal bell tower.

References

Roman Catholic churches in Orvieto
12th-century Roman Catholic church buildings in Italy
Romanesque architecture in Orvieto